Events in 1966 in Japanese television.

Debuts

Ongoing shows
Music Fair, music (1964–present)
Hyokkori Hyō Tanjima, anime (1964-1969)
Obake no Q-tarō, anime (1965-1967)

Endings

See also
1966 in anime
1966 in Japan
List of Japanese films of 1966

References